The Gülsün class is a series of container ships built for Mediterranean Shipping Company (MSC). The largest ships have a maximum theoretical capacity of 23,756 twenty-foot equivalent units (TEU). They were the largest container ships in the world when they were launched in 2019, surpassing  (21,413 TEU). The ships were the first container ships to feature 24 containers wide on deck.

Orders and history 
In 2017, MSC confirmed the order of 11 container ships with a capacity of at least 22,000 TEU. Six of them were to be built by Samsung Heavy Industries and the remaining five would be built by Daewoo Shipbuilding and Marine Engineering.

In 2019 MSC reportedly ordered five additional container ships from DSME as part of the original order. These ships are expected to start delivery by the end of 2021.

On 28 July 2019 MSC Gülsün set a new container loading record by departing from the port of Tanjung Pelepas with 19,574 TEU of containers on board.

List of ships

See also

References 

Container ship classes
Ships built by Samsung Heavy Industries
Ships built by Daewoo Shipbuilding & Marine Engineering